Dominick Salvatore (born 1940) is an American economist, currently Distinguished Professor at Fordham University, an Honorary Professor at Shanghai Finance University, Hunan University, and University of Pretoria, Director of the Global Economic Policy Center and a Fellow of the American Association for the Advancement of Science and New York Academy of Sciences. He is the author of "International Economics".

References

External links

21st-century American economists
City College of New York alumni
City University of New York alumni
1940 births
Living people
Fordham University faculty